The southern small-toothed moss mouse (Pseudohydromys pumehanae) is a species of rodent in the family Muridae found on the slopes of Mount Bosavi, Papua New Guinea.

References 

Pseudohydromys
Rodents of Papua New Guinea